Kyle Keston McGowin (born November 27, 1991) is an American professional baseball pitcher who is a free agent. He has played in Major League Baseball (MLB) for the Washington Nationals.

Amateur career
McGowin is from Sag Harbor, New York. He attended Pierson High School, and pitched for the school's baseball team. After graduating in 2010, he enrolled at Savannah State University, and played college baseball for the Savannah State Tigers. In the 2013 Mid-Eastern Athletic Conference baseball tournament, he was named the tournament's Outstanding Performer after he pitched all ten innings of the championship game, recording 11 strikeouts. The National Collegiate Baseball Writers Association named him a First Team All-American in 2013, his junior year.

Professional career

Los Angeles Angels
The Angels selected McGowin in the fifth round, with the 157th overall selection, of the 2013 MLB draft. After he signed with the Angels, he made his professional debut with the Orem Owlz of the Rookie-level Pioneer League. He pitched for the Inland Empire 66ers of the Class A-Advanced California League in 2014, and was named a Midseason All-Star. He spent the 2015 season with the Arkansas Travelers of the Class AA Texas League, and was invited to spring training in 2016. He began the 2016 season with Arkansas, and was promoted to the Salt Lake Bees of the Class AAA Pacific Coast League.

Washington Nationals
After the 2016 season, the Washington Nationals acquired McGowin and Austin L. Adams for Danny Espinosa. McGowin started the year with the Class-AAA Syracuse Chiefs but was assigned down to the Class-AA Harrisburg Senators on June 16, 2017, after posting a 6.31 ERA and a 1–6 win–loss record in nine starts. He pitched for the Mesa Solar Sox in the Arizona Fall League after the 2017 season, making six starts and striking out 27 batters without a walk allowed.

In 2018, McGowin bounced back, earning a promotion back to Class-AAA midway through the season and putting up a 1.20 ERA down the stretch with the Chiefs as a reliable starting pitcher. He was among several pitchers mentioned by media as potential late-season call-ups by the Nationals.

On September 3, 2018, the Nationals selected McGowin's contract, calling him up to the major leagues for the first time. He made his major league debut on September 5, pitching an inning against the St. Louis Cardinals and giving up a solo home run to Yairo Muñoz.

McGowin appeared in 7 games for the Nationals in 2019, registering an ugly 10.13 ERA with 18 strikeouts in 16.0 innings of work. Although he was not on the National's postseason roster, the Nationals won the World Series in 2019 and McGowin earned his first championship title. Pitching in relief against the Atlanta Braves on September 5, 2020, McGowin earned his first career win. On the season, McGowin appeared in 9 games for the Nationals, pitching to a 4.91 ERA with 16 strikeouts in 11.0 innings pitched.

In 2021, McGowin made 27 appearances for the Nationals, recording a 4.20 ERA with 35 strikeouts in 30.0 innings of work. On September 4, 2021, McGowin was placed on the 60-day injured list after being diagnosed with a UCL sprain in his right elbow. On November 5, 2021, McGowin was outrighted off of the 40-man roster.

Pitching style
McGowin pitches right-handed, with a crossfire delivery that adds deception to his pitches. He is considered to have above-average control.

References

External links

Living people
1991 births
People from Southampton (town), New York
Baseball players from New York (state)
Major League Baseball pitchers
Washington Nationals players
Savannah State Tigers baseball players
Orem Owlz players
Inland Empire 66ers of San Bernardino players
Arkansas Travelers players
Salt Lake Bees players
Arizona League Angels players
Syracuse Chiefs players
Harrisburg Senators players
Potomac Nationals players
Fresno Grizzlies players
Rochester Red Wings players